Lucina amiantus, or the decorated lucine, is a species of bivalve mollusc in the family Lucinidae. 

It can be found along the Atlantic coast of North America, ranging from North Carolina to the West Indies and Brazil.

References

 Turgeon, D. D., W. G. Lyons, P. Mikkelsen, G. Rosenberg, and F. Moretzsohn. 2009. Bivalvia (Mollusca) of the Gulf of Mexico, Pp. 711–744 in Felder, D.L. and D.K. Camp (eds.), Gulf of Mexico–Origins, Waters, and Biota. Biodiversity. Texas A&M Press, College
 Taylor J. & Glover E. (2021). Biology, evolution and generic review of the chemosymbiotic bivalve family Lucinidae. London: The Ray Society
 Garfinkle E. A. R. (2012) A review of North American Recent Radiolucina (Bivalvia, Lucinidae) with the description of a new species. ZooKeys 205: 19–31

External links
 Dall W.H. (1901). Synopsis of the Lucinacea and of the American species. Proceedings of the United States National Museum. 23: 779-833, pls 39-42.,

Lucinidae
Molluscs of the Atlantic Ocean
Bivalves described in 1901
Taxa named by William Healey Dall